is a 2010 arcade rhythm game created by Sega and Crypton Future Media for arcade machines. The game is a port of the 2009 video game, Hatsune Miku: Project DIVA, with updated visuals and was released on June 23, 2010 in Japan with limited international release in countries such as Singapore. Like the original the game primarily makes use of Vocaloids, a series of singing synthesizer software, and the songs created using these Vocaloids, most notably, the virtual diva Hatsune Miku.

A sequel titled  was released on November 21, 2013. Notable changes include upgraded graphics and physics, a Touch Slider panel for arrow-shaped notes and new songs, as well as running on the Sega Nu arcade board.

Gameplay

As the game is a port of the PlayStation Portable games, the gameplay is relatively the same as the original. The signature PlayStation shaped buttons, cross, circle, square and triangle are now the 4 large buttons on the machine's panel, and players push those buttons to play the games. Unlike the handheld versions of the game, players can hold a button or buttons for an unlimited time when the game indicates to hold a certain note. This will allow players to receive a bonus which continually increases the score until the player releases one of the held button or a "Max Hold Bonus" is granted. Another difference is that multiple buttons can be hit at the same time up to all four buttons. The arcade version features songs from both Hatsune Miku: Project DIVA series and Hatsune Miku and Future Stars: Project Mirai, along with a variety of original songs not included in either of the handheld versions. The Promotional Videos (PVs) for the game, which are the videos playing in the background during a song have been updated and re-rendered for the game bearing a similar resemblance to the Dreamy Theater versions of the PVs. Players have the ability to choose from a reel of songs and select their difficulty before playing a song, similar to a Dance Dance Revolution arcade game. The four difficulties are Easy, Normal, Hard, and Extreme, as seen in Project DIVA 2nd. The PlayStation 4 version added arrow icons, using the singature PlayStation shaped button colors. Furthermore, Hatsune Miku: Project Diva MegaMix / Hatsune Miku: Project Diva Mega39's featured a newly re-tooled toon shader effect to match the anime visuals, along with new letter icons with a different color set to fit the singature four letter buttons on the Nintendo Switch (red A, orange B, green Y and blue X), Mix Mode, which allows the Joy-Con controllers, using the L/SL and R/SR buttons to the beat, and Touch Play, which uses the Nintendo Switch's touch screen instead of the controllers. In Hatsune Miku: Project Diva MegaMix+ / Hatsune Miku: Project Diva Mega39's+ allows the ability to switch between the two visual styles, as well as a new color set to letter button icons to match the signature Xbox letter buttons (red B, green A, blue X and yellow Y).

IC card function and Diva.Net
This arcade game utilizes an IC card function. Players can select to obtain a Project DIVA Arcade access card from any machine. This card will open more functions for use in Project DIVA Arcade, many of those functions resembling features in the hand-held games. With an access card, players will be able to save and load arcade data, select module outfits for use in the game, select a player name, and more. Vocaloid Points (VP) can also be accumulated through successful plays. VP can be used for gaining features, like modules, or changing player's name. Access Card holders can also participate in trials, similar to the console versions of Dance Dance Revolution. In these three-tier trials, named "Clear Trial", "Great Clear Trial", and "Perfect Clear Trial" by difficulty, the player must bet a certain amount of VP. If the player pass a trial, the VP will be kept, and receive the amount the player bet. If the trial is lost, the amount of VP bet is deducted from the total. Clearing "Perfect Clear Trial" will also net a large sum of VP.

Also, during Access Card creation, the game will ask the player to create a user name and password. This will be registered on the Internet and allows an Access Card holder to gain access to the "Project DIVA Arcade Diva.Net". Here, an Access Card holder can edit data and perform many and more of the functions that a Project DIVA Arcade machine can do. However, an Access Card holder must first accumulate 10 non-consecutive plays on any Project DIVA Arcade machine with an Internet connection before they can use many of Diva.Net's functions. Once 10 plays are accumulated, the Access Card holder will gain 30-day access to all of Diva.Net's functions. Access to Diva.Net can only be performed this way, and one gains another 30 days of access every 10 plays. This "access" is known as a Diva.Net Right. Upon first play, a Card holder can automatically obtain a Diva.Net Right once. Losing one's Right does not affect the data, but the Card holder is unable to change it through Diva.Net until another Right is obtained.

Development
Project DIVA Arcade began development on the Virtua Fighter 5 engine, with a Hatsune Miku model being created in the engine with Dural as a base and then with the attributes changed to look like Miku instead. At the Summer 2009 Miku Festival, a prototype of Project DIVA Arcade was made using the Virtua Fighter 5 engine running on the Sega Lindbergh arcade board. Subsequently, the game became a full-fledged project at Sega. Development branched off from Virtua Fighter 5 and was transferred to the newer RingEdge arcade boards that then debuted as a prototype at a Spring 2010 Miku Fan event. Most changes made were with regards to the game's graphics and animation effects such as particles and motion blur.

Sega announced that Hatsune Miku: Project DIVA would be coming to arcades on October 5, 2009 and along with it a plea to fans to submit their own music for the game's track list. This was done between October 15 and October 31 where fans would upload their video to the Project DIVA Nico Nico Channel. These songs needed to be original songs and not remixes or variations of existing songs that were between 2 and a half minutes to 3 and a half minutes. The winners would then have their songs chosen by the game's development staff and then used in the release of the game. In addition, the website Piapro even held an event/contest for artists to submit their own created Vocaloid songs as well as illustrations for the game. Tripshots designed the machine which will include four buttons which has the same gameplay as its predecessor on the PSP.

Versions

Project DIVA Arcade
 Hatsune Miku: Project DIVA Arcade (2010)
 Hatsune Miku: Project DIVA Arcade Revision 1 (2010)
 Hatsune Miku: Project DIVA Arcade Revision 2 (2010)
 Hatsune Miku: Project DIVA Arcade Revision 3 (2010)
 Hatsune Miku: Project DIVA Arcade Version A (2011)
 Hatsune Miku: Project DIVA Arcade Version A Revision 1 (2011)
 Hatsune Miku: Project DIVA Arcade Version A Revision 2 (2011)
 Hatsune Miku: Project DIVA Arcade Version A Revision 3 (2011)
 Hatsune Miku: Project DIVA Arcade Version A Revision 3.1 (2011)
 Hatsune Miku: Project DIVA Arcade Version A Revision 4 (2012)
 Hatsune Miku: Project DIVA Arcade Version B (2012)
 Hatsune Miku: Project DIVA Arcade Version B Revision 1 (2012)
 Hatsune Miku: Project DIVA Arcade Version B Revision 2 (2012)
 Hatsune Miku: Project DIVA Arcade Version B Revision 3 (2013)

Project DIVA Arcade Future Tone
 Hatsune Miku: Project DIVA Arcade Future Tone (2013)
 Hatsune Miku: Project DIVA Arcade Future Tone Revision 1 (2013)
 Hatsune Miku: Project DIVA Arcade Future Tone Revision 2 (2013)
 Hatsune Miku: Project DIVA Arcade Future Tone Revision 3 (2014)
 Hatsune Miku: Project DIVA Arcade Future Tone Revision 4 (2014)
 Hatsune Miku: Project DIVA Arcade Future Tone Revision 5 (2014)
 Hatsune Miku: Project DIVA Arcade Future Tone Version A (2014)
 Hatsune Miku: Project DIVA Arcade Future Tone Version A Revision 1 (2014)
 Hatsune Miku: Project DIVA Arcade Future Tone Version A Revision 2 (2015)
 Hatsune Miku: Project DIVA Arcade Future Tone Version A Revision 3 (2015)
 Hatsune Miku: Project DIVA Arcade Future Tone Version A Revision 4.1 (2015)
 Hatsune Miku: Project DIVA Arcade Future Tone Version A Revision 5 (2015)
 Hatsune Miku: Project DIVA Arcade Future Tone Version A Revision 6 (2016)
 Hatsune Miku: Project DIVA Arcade Future Tone Version A Revision 6.1 (2016)
 Hatsune Miku: Project DIVA Arcade Future Tone Version B (2016)
 Hatsune Miku: Project DIVA Arcade Future Tone Version B Revision 1 (2016)
 Hatsune Miku: Project DIVA Arcade Future Tone Version B Revision 2 (2016)
 Hatsune Miku: Project DIVA Arcade Future Tone Version B Revision 3 (2016)

Project DIVA Future Tone
On September 15, 2015, during the SCEJA Press Conference at Tokyo Game Show 2015, Sega announced that the company was porting Hatsune Miku: Project DIVA Arcade Future Tone to the PlayStation 4 under the title Hatsune Miku: Project DIVA Future Tone. On May 27, 2016, a trailer for the game was released on the franchise's official YouTube channel, where it was revealed that the game would include two expansion packs available to download separately or together via the PlayStation Store; Future Sound and Colorful Tone. Future Sound contains songs originally featured in the mainstream Project DIVA games, while Colorful Tone contains songs originally featured in Project DIVA Arcade (some not included due to rights issues) and the Project Mirai games, as well as over 340 unlockable modules. A base demo software version of the game, Prelude, was also made available. In addition, the game supports a screen resolution of up to 4K at a refresh rate of 60 frames per second.

The game was released digitally on June 23, 2016 in Japan, with an international release following on January 10, 2017.

Songs
There is a total of 252 songs in the game as of March 2021. Many songs are songs from previous Project DIVA games, including Project Mirai. There are also songs exclusive to this game, including ones made from the Edit Mode in the games, animated PVs, and PVs made from Sega.

Songs with a light blue background are songs from previous games.
Songs with a pink background are animated PVs
Songs with an orange background are songs from previous games added after Future Tone update.
Songs with a yellow background are songs added after Future Tone update.

Reception
Project DIVA Future Tone won the award for "Best Rhythm/Music Game" at Game Informers Best of 2017 Awards, while it came in third place for the same category in their Reader's Choice Best of 2017 Awards. In addition, it was nominated for "Game, Music or Performance Based" at the National Academy of Video Game Trade Reviewers Awards.

Notes

References

External links
Official Site 

2010 video games
Arcade video games
Music video games
PlayStation 4 games
Sega arcade games
Video games developed in Japan
Creative works using vocaloids
Hatsune Miku: Project DIVA games